DF Concerts & Events (formerly known as Dance Factory Concerts) is a music and event promoter, which is based in and operates across Scotland. The company was founded in 1982 in Dundee, Scotland as Dance Factory Concerts.

DF Concerts promote and manage the TRNSMT festival and owns and manages King Tut's Wah Wah Hut in Glasgow. The company previously organised T in the Park, The Edge Festival and Connect.

In 2010, it organised the Papal Mass in Bellahouston Park as part of Pope Benedict XVI's visit to the United Kingdom.

References

External links
DF Concerts Official Site

Companies based in Glasgow
Event management companies of the United Kingdom
Music organisations based in the United Kingdom
Live Nation Entertainment
Festival organizations
T in the Park